Licun Park is a station on Line 2 of the Qingdao Metro. It opened on 10 December 2017. It is located in Licang District and it is the current northbound terminus of Line 2.

References

Qingdao Metro stations
Railway stations in China opened in 2017